The list of shipwrecks in July 1887 includes ships sunk, foundered, grounded, or otherwise lost during July 1887.

1 July

2 July

3 July

5 July

7 July

8 July

9 July

10 July

12 July

13 July

14 July

15 July

18 July

20 July

23 July

25 July

26 July

27 July

30 July

31 July

Unknown date

References

1887-07
Maritime incidents in July 1887